Gunnarson is a surname of Scandinavian origin, meaning son of Gunnar. Notable people with the surname include:

Dean Gunnarson (born 1964), Canadian escapologist
Gunnar Gunnarson (born 1918), Swedish marxist historian

Surnames of Scandinavian origin